Platyla maasseni is a species of very small land snail with an operculum, a terrestrial gastropod mollusk or micromollusk in the family Aciculidae. This species is endemic to Serbia and Montenegro.

References

External links 
 AnimalBase info

Platyla
Gastropods described in 1989
Molluscs of Europe
Taxonomy articles created by Polbot